The Linguistic Atlas of the Gulf States, edited by Lee Pederson, is a linguistic map describing the dialects of the American Gulf States.

References

Works about American English
Gulf States